Paolo Emilio Sfondrati (1560 – 14 February 1618) was an Italian Cardinal.

Biography
Born to a noble family in Milan and the nephew of Pope Gregory XIV, he was the cardinal priest of Santa Cecilia in Trastevere, papal legate in Bologna, member of the Congregation of the Sant'Offizio and a good friend of San Filippo Neri. His sister, Paola Antonia was prioress of the Angelic Sisters of Saint Paul. In 1599 Sfondrati undertook excavations in his titular church that led to the discovery of a body that he believed to be that of Saint Cecilia herself.

He was bishop of Cremona, and bishop of Albano. Pope Clement VIII made him an Inquisitor in 1600.
He died in Tivoli in 1618.

Episcopal succession

Notes

External links

1560 births
1618 deaths
Cardinal-nephews
Clergy from Milan
17th-century Italian cardinals
Cardinal-bishops of Albano
Cardinal Secretaries of State